Chain Lake may refer to:

Chain Lake (Michigan), a lake in Mackinac County
Chain Lake (Minnesota), a lake in Chisago County
Chain Lake, Washington, a census-designated place

See also
Chain O'Lakes
Chain of Lakes (disambiguation)